State Route 165 (SR 165) is a state highway near the southern end of the U.S. state of Nevada. The road connects the town of Nelson to U.S. Route 95. The road originated in the 1940s and was one section of former State Route 60 until the 1970s.

Route description

From there, the state highway follows Nelson Road in a southeasterly direction through Eldorado Valley  to its end just outside the town of Nelson. The town of Nelson was established in 1905 following several mining claims being discovered in the valley. Although the small community is still inhabited, the remains of many mining operations and abandoned structures can still be seen in the vicinity.

History

The route first appears on state highway maps in 1941 as part of State Route 60, a three-pronged route with each spoke connecting to the town of Nelson. The third leg of SR 60 ran east from Nelson  to the Colorado River. Both the northwest and eastern legs of the route were completely paved by 1951.

State Route 60 remained largely unchanged until the Nevada began renumbering of its state highway system on July 1, 1976. The remaining legs of SR 60 have since gone unnumbered.

Major intersections

References

Eldorado Valley
165
Transportation in Clark County, Nevada